Fighting Spirit Unleashed is a series of professional wrestling events produced annually in September by New Japan Pro-Wrestling (NJPW), a Japanese professional wrestling promotion, in the United States. NJPW first produced the event in 2018 and has since produced four editions, with the 2019 having been held as a three-event tour in Lowell, Massachusetts, New York City, New York and Philadelphia, Pennsylvania from September 27 to 29, 2019 and the most recent being held in closed doors due to the COVID-19 pandemic from September 4 to September 11, 2020.

Events

Notes

References

External links
The official New Japan Pro-Wrestling English website

New Japan Pro-Wrestling shows
Recurring events established in 2018